Edward Goatly (3 December 1882 – 12 February 1958) was an English cricketer. He played 126 first-class matches for Surrey between 1901 and 1914.

See also
 List of Surrey County Cricket Club players

References

External links
 

1882 births
1958 deaths
English cricketers
Surrey cricketers
Sportspeople from Twickenham